In mathematics, a pointed set (also based set or rooted set) is an ordered pair  where  is a set and  is an element of  called the base point, also spelled basepoint.

This is usually denoted
 .

Pointed sets are very simple algebraic structures. In the sense of universal algebra, a pointed set is a set  together with a single nullary operation  which picks out the basepoint. Pointed maps are the homomorphisms of these algebraic structures.

The class of all pointed sets together with the class of all based maps form a category.  In this category the pointed singleton sets  are initial objects and terminal objects, i.e. they are zero objects.  There is a faithful functor from pointed sets to usual sets, but it is not full and these categories are not equivalent. In particular, the empty set is not a pointed set because it has no element that can be chosen as the basepoint.

The category of pointed sets and based maps is equivalent to the category of sets and partial functions. The base point serves as a "default value" for those arguments for which the partial function is not defined. One textbook notes that "This formal completion of sets and partial maps by adding 'improper', 'infinite' elements was reinvented many times, in particular, in topology (one-point compactification) and in theoretical computer science."

This coincides with the algebraic characterization, since the unique map  extends the commutative triangles defining arrows of the coslice category to form the commutative squares defining homomorphisms of the algebras.

The category of pointed sets and pointed maps has both products and coproducts, but it is not a distributive category.

Many algebraic structures are pointed sets in a rather trivial way. For example, groups are pointed sets by choosing the identity element as the basepoint, so that group homomorphisms are point-preserving maps. This observation can be restated in category theoretic terms as the existence of a forgetful functor from groups to pointed sets.

A pointed set may be seen as a pointed space under the discrete topology or as a vector space over the field with one element.

As "rooted set" the notion naturally appears in the study of antimatroids and transportation polytopes.

See also

References

External links
 Pullbacks in Category of Sets and Partial Functions
 
 

Basic concepts in set theory
Algebraic structures
Category theory